A Few Notes on Our Food Problem is a 1968 American documentary film directed by James Blue. It was nominated for an Academy Award for Best Documentary Feature.

See also
List of American films of 1968

References

External links

, posted by the Knight Library

1968 films
1968 documentary films
American documentary films
1960s English-language films
1960s American films